This is a list of defunct airlines of São Tomé and Príncipe.

See also

 List of airlines of São Tomé and Príncipe
 List of airports in São Tomé and Príncipe

References

Sao Tome and Principe
Airlines
Airlines, Defunct